1978 in sports describes the year's events in world sport.

Alpine skiing
 Alpine Skiing World Cup
 Men's overall season champion: Ingemar Stenmark, Sweden
 Women's overall season champion: Hanni Wenzel, Liechtenstein

American football
 January 15 − Super Bowl XII: the Dallas Cowboys (NFC) won 27−10 over the Denver Broncos (AFC)
 Location: Superdome	
 Attendance: 76,400	
 co–MVPs: Harvey Martin, DE and Randy White, DT (Dallas)
 The Holy Roller Game – Oakland Raiders vs San Diego Chargers
 Cotton Bowl (1977 season):
 The Notre Dame Fighting Irish won 38–10 over the Texas Longhorns to win the college football national championship

Artistic gymnastics
 World Artistic Gymnastics Championships –
 Men's all-around champion: Nikolai Andrianov, USSR
 Women's all-around champion: Elena Mukhina, USSR
 Men's team competition champion: Japan
 Women's team competition champion: USSR

Association football
 Football World Cup – Argentina wins 3-1 (after extra time) over the Netherlands
 England - FA Cup – Ipswich Town win 1–0 over Arsenal
 England - League – Nottingham Forest win the championship as well as the League Cup
 La Liga won by Real Madrid
 Primeira Liga won by FC Porto
 Serie A won by Juventus
 French Division 1 won by AS Monaco
 European Cup won by  Liverpool
 Kirin Cup tournament is first held in Japan (international club competition phase).
 Major Indoor Soccer League begins operations in the United States.

Athletics
 August – 1978 Commonwealth Games held at Edmonton, Alberta, Canada
 September – 1978 European Championships in Athletics held at Prague
 December – 1978 Asian Games held at Bangkok, Thailand

Australian rules football
Victorian Football League
 1 July: Footscray beat Carlton's nine year record for the highest VFL score when they kick 33.15 (213) to St. Kilda’s 16.10 (106). Kelvin Templeton and Ian Dunstan amass 22 goals between them, equalling the 1931 record of Doug Strang and Jack Titus (who died that year).
 Hawthorn wins the 82nd VFL Premiership (Hawthorn 18.13 (121) d North Melbourne 15.13 (103))
 Brownlow Medal awarded to Malcolm Blight (North Melbourne)
South Australian National Football League
 30 September: Norwood 16.15 (111) pip Sturt 14.26 (110) to win their twenty-fourth league premiership after the Double Blues had lost only one match all season.
 Magarey Medal awarded to Kym Hodgeman (Glenelg)
Western Australian National Football League
 23 September: East Perth 11.15 (81) defeat Perth 12.7 (79) to win their fourteenth WA(N)FL premiership
 Sandover Medal won by Phil Kelly (East Perth)

Baseball
 May 5, 1978 – Pete Rose of the Cincinnati Reds becomes the 13th player in Major League history to collect 3,000 career hits.
 June 14-July 31 – Pete Rose hits safely in 44 consecutive games, tying Willie Keeler’s all-time National League hitting streak.
 September 23 – Lyman Bostock (27) of the California Angels is shot and killed in error by a jealous husband.
 World Series – New York Yankees win 4 games to 2 over the Los Angeles Dodgers. The Series MVP is Bucky Dent, New York

Basketball
 Wilt Chamberlain is elected to the Naismith Memorial Basketball Hall of Fame, along with coaches Sam Barry, Eddie Hickey, John McLendon, Ray Meyer and Pete Newell, and referee Jim Enright
 NCAA Men's Division I Basketball Championship –
 Kentucky wins 94-88 over Duke
 NBA Finals –
 Washington Bullets win 4 games to 3 over the Seattle SuperSonics
 FIBA World Championship
 Yugoslavia World Champion

Boxing
 February 15 – Leon Spinks defeats Muhammad Ali by decision in 15 rounds to win the world heavyweight title.
 Second World Amateur Boxing Championships held in Belgrade, Yugoslavia
 September 15 – Muhammad Ali recovers the world’s heavyweight title, beating Leon Spinks by decision in their rematch. It is the first time a boxer wins the world heavyweight title for a third time.

Canadian football
 Grey Cup – Edmonton Eskimos win 20–13 over the Montreal Alouettes
 Vanier Cup – Queen's Golden Gaels win 16–3 over the UBC Thunderbirds

Cycling
 Giro d'Italia won by Johan de Muynck of Belgium
 Tour de France won by Bernard Hinault of France
 UCI Road World Championships – Men's road race – Gerrie Knetemann of Netherlands

Dogsled racing
 Iditarod Trail Sled Dog Race Champion –
 Dick Mackey wins with lead dogs: Skipper & Shrew

Field hockey
 Men's World Cup held in Buenos Aires and won by Pakistan
 Men’s European Nations Cup held in Hannover and won by West Germany
 Men’s Champions Trophy held in Lahore and won by Pakistan
 Women’s World Cup held in Madrid and won by the Netherlands

Figure skating
 World Figure Skating Championships –
 Men’s champion: Charles Tickner, United States
 Ladies’ champion: Anett Pötzsch, Germany
 Pair skating champions: Irina Rodnina & Alexander Zaitsev, Soviet Union
 Ice dancing champions: Natalia Linichuk & Gennadi Karponossov, Soviet Union

Golf
Men's professional
 Masters Tournament - Gary Player
 U.S. Open - Andy North
 British Open - Jack Nicklaus
 PGA Championship - John Mahaffey
 PGA Tour money leader - Tom Watson - $362,429
Men's amateur
 British Amateur - Peter McEvoy
 U.S. Amateur - John Cook
Women's professional
 LPGA Championship - Nancy Lopez
 U.S. Women's Open - Hollis Stacy
 LPGA Tour money leader - Nancy Lopez - $189,814

Harness racing
 United States Pacing Triple Crown races –
 Cane Pace - Armbro Tiger
 Little Brown Jug - Happy Escort
 Messenger Stakes - Abercrombie
 United States Trotting Triple Crown races –
 Hambletonian - Speedy Somolli
 Yonkers Trot - Speedy Somolli
 Kentucky Futurity - Doublemint
 Australian Inter Dominion Harness Racing Championship –
 Pacers: Markovina
 Trotters: Derby Royale

Horse racing
Steeplechases
 Cheltenham Gold Cup – Midnight Court
 Grand National – Lucius
Hurdle races
 Champion Hurdle – Monksfield
Flat races
 Australia – Melbourne Cup won by Arwon
 Canada – Queen's Plate won by Regal Embrace
 France – Prix de l'Arc de Triomphe won by Alleged
 Ireland – Irish Derby Stakes won by Shirley Heights
 English Triple Crown Races:
 2,000 Guineas Stakes – Roland Gardens
 The Derby – Shirley Heights
 St. Leger Stakes – Julio Mariner
 United States Triple Crown Races:
 Kentucky Derby – Affirmed
 Preakness Stakes – Affirmed
 Belmont Stakes – Affirmed

Ice hockey
 Art Ross Trophy as the NHL’s leading scorer during the regular season: Guy Lafleur, Montreal Canadiens
 Hart Memorial Trophy for the NHL’s Most Valuable Player: Guy Lafleur, Montreal Canadiens
 Stanley Cup – Montreal Canadiens win 4 games to 2 over the Boston Bruins
 World Hockey Championship
 Men’s champion: Soviet Union defeated Czechoslovakia
 Junior Men’s champion: Soviet Union defeated Sweden
Note: In the early years of the Junior tournament, Canada did not send a true National Junior team to the event. Instead, the Memorial Cup champions usually went to represent Canada. The exception was 1978 in Montreal, when an “all-star” team was put together.
 Avco World Trophy - Winnipeg Jets won 4 games to 0 over the New England Whalers

Motorsport

Orienteering
1978 World Orienteering Championships.

Rowing
 March – The Cambridge boat sinks during the annual English University Boat Race, the first sinking in the race since 1951.

Rugby league
1978 Amco Cup
1978 European Rugby League Championship
1978 Kangaroo tour
1978 New Zealand rugby league season
1977–78 Northern Rugby Football League season / 1978–79 Northern Rugby Football League season
1978 NSWRFL season
 28 May – In a horrific accident at Penrith Park, Panther prop John Farragher is left a quadriplegic after breaking his neck in a scrum – the worst accident in rugby league history.

Rugby union
 84th Five Nations Championship series is won by Wales who complete the Grand Slam

Snooker
 World Snooker Championship – Ray Reardon beats Perrie Mans 25-18
 World rankings – Ray Reardon remains world number one for 1978/79.

Speed skating
 First ISU Short Track Speed Skating Championships for men and ladies held in Solihull, UK

Swimming
 The third FINA World Championships held in West-Berlin, West Germany
 July 29 – USA's Ron Manganiello sets a world record in the 50m freestyle at a swimming meet in Miami, Florida (United States), shaving off 0.02 of the previous record (23.74) set by Joe Bottom a year ago: 23.72.

Tennis
 Grand Slam in tennis men's results:
 Australian Open - Guillermo Vilas
 French Open - Björn Borg
 Wimbledon championships - Björn Borg
 U.S. Open - Jimmy Connors
 Grand Slam in tennis women's results:
 Australian Open - Chris O'Neil
 French Open - Virginia Ruzici
 Wimbledon championships - Martina Navratilova
 U.S. Open - Chris Evert
 Davis Cup – United States win 4–1 over Great Britain in world tennis.
 US Open moves to hard courts of the USTA National Tennis Center in Flushing Meadows, New York.
 Total prize money at US Open exceeds US$500,000.

Triathlon
 First Ironman Triathlon held in Kona, Hawaii

Volleyball
 1978 FIVB Men's World Championship held in Rome and won by USSR

Water polo
 1978 World Aquatics Championships held in West Berlin and won by Italy.

General sporting events
 Third All-Africa Games held in Algiers, Algeria
 Eighth Asian Games held in Bangkok, Thailand
 Central American and Caribbean Games held in Medellin, Colombia
 The Commonwealth Games held in Edmonton, Alberta, Canada
 Ninth Winter Universiade held in Špindleruv Mlýn, Czechoslovakia

Awards
 Associated Press Male Athlete of the Year – Ron Guidry, Major League Baseball
 Associated Press Female Athlete of the Year – Nancy Lopez, LPGA golf

References

 
Sports by year